Moussa Yahaya (born 4 January 1975) is a Nigerien retired footballer who played as a striker. He represented the Niger national team on sixteen occasions.

Football career
Born in Agadez, Yahaya began playing with JS du Ténéré. In 1995, he started an abroad adventure that would last more than a decade, first with Sokół Tychy then with Hutnik Kraków – he spent most of his career in Poland, amassing Ekstraklasa totals of 77 games and 17 goals over the course of six seasons.

After two-and-a-half years with relative impact with Albacete Balompié (Spanish second division), scoring 13 times from 72 competitive matches, and a brief spell with Greece's Trikala FC, Yahaya returned to Poland, representing GKS Katowice (2001, 2003–05) and Legia Warsaw (2001–02). From 2005 onwards he continued in the latter country, but in an amateur level (fourth division), with Rega-Merida Trzebiatów (one season) and Mazur Karczew.
 
Yahaya was also a full Nigerien international in the 90s.

External links

1975 births
Living people
People from Agadez
Nigerien footballers
Association football forwards
Ekstraklasa players
GKS Tychy players
Hutnik Nowa Huta players
GKS Katowice players
Legia Warsaw players
Segunda División players
Albacete Balompié players
Super League Greece players
Trikala F.C. players
Niger international footballers
Expatriate footballers in Poland
Expatriate footballers in Spain
Expatriate footballers in Greece